The Flute Concerto is a composition for solo flute and orchestra by the American composer Ned Rorem.  The work was commissioned by the Philadelphia Orchestra and was composed between August 2001 and May 2002.  Its world premiere was given by the flutist Jeffrey Khaner and the Philadelphia Orchestra conducted by Roberto Abbado at the Kimmel Center for the Performing Arts on December 4, 2003.

Composition

Structure
The piece has a duration of roughly 25 minutes and is cast in six movements:
The Stone Tower
Leaving – Traveling – Hoping
Sirens
Hymn
False Waltz
Résumé and Prayer

Rorem commented on the movement titles in the score program notes, writing, "I don't believe that non-vocal music can be proved to "mean" anything precise, like Love or Death or Fright, much less Yellow or Tuesday or Lake. But sometimes it's helpful and fun to ascribe (usually after the fact) names to separate movements."  He continued:

Instrumentation
The work is scored for a solo flute and an orchestra comprising two additional flutes, two oboes, two clarinets, two bassoons, two horns, two trumpets, timpani, piano, harp, and strings.

Reception
Reviewing a recording of the piece paired with Rorem's Violin Concerto and Pilgrims, Peter Dickinson of Gramophone wrote, "This is relaxed and indulgent music, even if these works are not the best from this now grand old man of American music."  John von Rhein of the Chicago Tribune similarly described it as an "inventively quirky mosaic of instrumental songs without words."

References

Concertos by Ned Rorem
2002 compositions
Rorem, Ned
Music commissioned by the Philadelphia Orchestra